Eber is an unincorporated community in Fayette County, in the U.S. state of Ohio.

History
A post office was established at Eber in 1892, and remained in operation until 1902. The community took its name from the local Mt. Eber Sunday School.

References

Unincorporated communities in Fayette County, Ohio
Unincorporated communities in Ohio